Dale A. Sweetland (born March 29, 1949) is a Republican politician from Fabius, New York. In 2008, Sweetland ran for the seat of retiring Republican Congressman James T. Walsh, against Democrat Dan Maffei, but was defeated 55% to 42% in the November 4 general election.

Political career
Dale Sweetland was first elected to public office in 1988, when he won election as Town Supervisor for the town of Fabius, New York, serving in this post until 1994. Sweetland was elected to the Onondaga County Legislature in 1994, serving as the representative of the 12th Legislative District for seven terms.

His fellow County Legislators elected Sweetland as their Chairman in 2002, a post he continued to hold for the next six years. In March 2007, Sweetland announced his candidacy for Onondaga County Executive, following the announced retirement of Nicholas J. Pirro. Sweetland won the endorsement of the Onondaga County GOP but lost the Republican primary by 21 votes to Joanie Mahoney, who went on to a 22-point victory over her Democratic opponent.

2008 Congressional campaign

In April 2008, Sweetland announced his candidacy for the United States Congress.  In May 2008, Sweetland became the designated Republican candidate to replace Congressman James T. Walsh by winning the support of the Republican Party committees in Onondaga, Wayne, Monroe, and Cayuga Counties.
In May 2008 and again on June 20, 2008, the Washington Post's Chris Cillizza, author of "The Fix", ranked the race to replace James T. Walsh the #1 Congressional race to turn over from a "Red" seat to a "Blue" seat 2008.

On November 4 Maffei defeated Sweetland, 55% to 42%.

Electoral history

References

External links
 

1949 births
Living people
New York (state) Republicans
People from Fabius, New York